Halali may refer to:

 Halali, Mashhad, a village in Iran
 Halali Airport, Oshikoto Region, Namibia
 Halali Reservoir, on the Halali River, Madhya Pradesh, India
 Halali, an area in Etosha National Park, Namibia
 "Halali", a 2018 episode of Die Kirche bleibt im Dorf

People
 Esmail Halali (born 1973), Iranian football player and manager
 Salim Halali (1920–2005), Algerian singer

See also
 Halalii Lake, Hawaii, US
 Helali (disambiguation)